The Dinagyang Festival is a religious and cultural festival in Iloilo City, Philippines, held annually on the 4th Sunday of January, or right after the Sinulog in Cebu and the Ati-Atihan Festival in Kalibo, Aklan. It is one of the biggest festivals in the Philippines, attracting more than a million domestic and international visitors every year.

The festival is the only one in the Philippines that has been awarded by the Association of Tourism Officers in the Philippines (ATOP) as the best tourism event for three consecutive years in 2006, 2007, and 2008. It is also the most awarded festival in the country with both national and international awards because of its legacy, popularity, and innovation. Recently, it received another back-to-back ATOP's Best Tourism Event Awards in 2020 and 2021. Dinagyang receives multiple honors and is regarded as the "Queen of All Philippine Festivals."

Etymology 
The word Dinagyang came from a Hiligaynon word extrapolated from dágyang, meaning “merrymaking.” The festival hosts a celebration of the Santo Niño (Holy Child or Infant Jesus) and the pact between the Datus and the locals after the arrival of Malay settlers and the legendary barter of Panay Island from the natives called Ati. The late Ilonggo broadcaster and writer Pacifico Sumagpao Sudario coined the term in 1977 to differentiate it from Kalibo's Ati-Atihan.

History
Dinagyang began after Rev. Fr. Ambrosio Galindez, the first Filipino Rector of the Augustinian Community and Parish Priest of the San Jose Parish introduced the devotion to Santo Niño in November 1967 after observing the Ati-Atihan Festival in the province of Aklan. On 1968, a replica of the original image of the Santo Niño de Cebu was brought to Iloilo by Fr. Sulpicio Enderez.

In the beginning, the observance of the feast was confined to the parish. The Confradia patterned the celebration on the Ati-atihan of Ibajay, Aklan, where natives dance in the streets, their bodies covered with soot and ashes, to simulate the Atis dancing to celebrate the sale of Panay. It was these tribal groups who were the prototype of the present festival.

In 1977, the Marcos government ordered the various regions of the Philippines to come up with festivals or celebrations that could boost tourism and development. The City of Iloilo readily identified the Iloilo Ati-Atihan as its project. At the same time the local parish could no longer handle the growing challenges of the festival.

Dinagyang was voted as the best tourism event for 2006, 2007 and 2008 by the Association of Tourism Officers in the Philippines Inc. (ATOP). It is one of few festivals in the world to get the support of the United Nations for the promotion of the Millennium Development Goals, and cited by the Asian Development Bank as Best Practice on government, private sector & NGO cooperatives. Recently, the ATOP once again declared the 2021 Dinagyang Digital as the Grand Winner of its Pearl Awards.

Celebration
The Dinagyang Festival is divided into three major events held annually every fourth weekend of January: the Ati Tribe Competition (held on a Sunday), Dagyang sa Calle Real (held on a Saturday prior to the main event the next day, the Ati Tribe competition), and the Miss Iloilo Dinagyang (which is held on the week of the main Dinagyang Festival highlights).

As an added attraction to the Ati Tribe competition, the Kasadyahan Cultural competition was added to the festival from the 1980s to 2019 to showcase the talents of the students as well as the rich cultural heritage of the province of Iloilo. In the first few years of this event, schools from various towns and cities in the province participated in this competition, but in recent times, the cultural competition confined only to the province has become a regional event, accepting entries from other provinces of the region, showcasing the best of Western Visayas cultural and historical heritage. Iloilo Festivals Foundation Inc. (IFFI) announced that the Kasadyahan Festival would no longer be part of the Dinagyang Festival starting in 2020. It was replaced by merry making or the "sadsad" that has been the central feature of the Ati-Atihan Festival of Kalibo, Aklan. Meanwhile, the Kasadyahan Festival will be celebrated in a separate month or possibly incorporated into the celebration of Iloilo City’s Charter Day. The Kasadyahan Regional Cultural Competition will return to Dinagyang in 2023 on Saturday preceding the main highlights of the mardi gras celebration the following day.

The main part of the festival, which is the Ati Tribe competition, consists of a number of "warrior" dancers (who hold a shield in one hand and a spear in another) in a tribe (locally called "tribu") dancing in a choreographed formation and patterns as well as chanting to the sound of loud drum beats and improvised percussion instruments innovated by the respective tribes. In the early years, a number of tribes were created, founded and organized by some of the barangay or communities around the city, but through the years, as the Dinagyang evolves and the competition becomes more competitive, gaining worldwide fame and attention, schools are starting to create and organize tribes, introducing dynamic new dance patterns, formations and choreography, soliciting sponsors from private companies for expenses and the cost of participating in the competition. No actual Ati are involved, nor do they benefit in any way from this event. There are a number of requirements, including that the performers must paint their skin black and be indigenous; other kinds of materials can be used for the costumes. All dances are performed to drum music. Many tribes are organized by the local high schools, and in recent times, some tribes came from as far as Batanes in Luzon and Cotabato in Mindanao. The tribes receive a subsidy from the IFFI and the city government of Iloilo and recruit private sponsors, with the best tribes receiving the most. The current Ati population of Iloilo is not involved with any of the tribes nor are they involved in the festival in any other way, although recently the original Atis from the hinterlands of Panay, specifically from the mountains of Barotac Nuevo and Anilao, came to participate non-competitively for recognition and to give them importance as being the characters symbolically portrayed in the festival.

Hala bira, a Hiligaynon phrase that means "dispense all means," is a popular catchphrase among Ilonggos to show enthusiastic involvement in the Dinagyang. During the celebration, the phrase is always heard attributed to the festival theme song, "Hala Bira, Iloilo!", played on every street in the city. The song was composed by award-winning musician and lyricist Dante M. Beriong and is one of the most recognizable festival theme songs in the Philippines.

Dinagyang Legacy

Dinagyang festival has brought a lot of innovations throughout the years. These innovations has influenced the way other festivals in the country is run. Among these are the following: 
 Carousel Performance - Dinagyang initiated the simultaneous performance of the competing tribes in different judging areas.
 Mobile Risers - Mobile risers is prominent feature of Dinagyang choreography today. It was introduced by Tribu Bola-bola in 1994. The risers has added depth and has improved the choreography of the dance movements.
 Dinagyang Pipes - First used by Tribu Ilonganon in 2005, the Dinagyang pipes are made of PVC pipes and are hammered by rubber paddles. Each pipe produces a distinct sound depending on the length and diameter of each pipe.
 Dagoy - The first festival mascot in the Philippines.

Dagoy
Dagoy is the official festival mascot of Dinagyang. He was born from the promotional sketches of Dinagyang in 2002. The caricature was later adopted as the official logo of the festival. He was introduced to the public on December 14, 2004 in The Fort, Taguig, and December 18, 2004 in Iloilo City. Depicted as a young Ati warrior, Dagoy symbolizes the jollification and friendship of the Ilonggo and the other thousands to millions of tourists flocked to witness the festival.

Dagoy stands six feet and nine inches tall. He has a dark brown skin tone and wears a headdress with an image of Sto. Niño. He is garbed with a camel-colored loincloth which is the typical attire of an Ati. Dagoy is holding a drum made of fiberglass with the logo of the Iloilo City Government printed at the center. His hands and feet are adorned with multi-colored bracelets, similar to these being worn by a Dinagyang warrior.

Dagoy's winsome smile is popular among children as such miniature version of the mascot is marketed as Dagoy Dolls.

Dinagyang Tribes Competition Winners 
The following list includes all the Ati Tribe Dance Competition winners every year.

See also
 Ati-Atihan Festival
 Ati people
 Negrito

References

External links
 Iloilo Dinagyang Photos 
 Dinagyang Festival in Aliwan Fiesta
 Iloilo Dinagyang Foundation, Inc.
 Philippines Travel Hub
 Iloilo Dinagyang Foundation Incorporated Official Facebook Page
http://www.rmgorrieza.co.uk/dinagyang-festival-gallery/

Cultural festivals in the Philippines
Visayan festivals
Culture of Iloilo
Tourist attractions in Iloilo City
Visayan culture
January observances
Christian Sunday observances